Heartlock is a 2019 American romantic crime drama film directed by Jon Kauffman and starring Alexander Dreymon, Lesley-Ann Brandt and Erik LaRay Harvey.  It is Kauffman's feature directorial debut.

Cast
Alexander Dreymon
Lesley-Ann Brandt
Erik LaRay Harvey
Cedric Young
Wayne David Parker
Javon Anderson

Release
The film was released in theaters in the United States and on VOD on January 25, 2019.

Reception
The film has  rating on Rotten Tomatoes.  Asher Luberto of Film Threat awarded the film a 4 out of 10.

Frank Scheck of The Hollywood Reporter gave the film a negative review and wrote that "this indie drama simply lacks the necessary cinematic tension. Despite fine performances from its lead performers, the film never fully comes to life."

References

External links
 
 

American romantic drama films
American crime drama films
2019 drama films
Romantic crime films
2010s English-language films
2010s American films